Ploshchad Marksa ( (Square of Marx )) is a station on the Leninskaya Line of the Novosibirsk Metro. It opened on July 26, 1991.

Novosibirsk Metro stations
Railway stations in Russia opened in 1991
Leninsky District, Novosibirsk
Railway stations located underground in Russia